The Samsung SPH-M520 (M520) is an Internet-enabled multimedia mobile phone, designed and marketed by Samsung Mobile. It uses a sliding keypad interface with talk interface buttons under the main screen. The M520, in addition to being a mobile phone, also functions as a camera phone with 1.3 MegaPixels, portable media player, text messenger, and a WAP 2.0 web browser and e-mail client.

Marketed as a replacement to the SPH-M510, Sprint's first EVDO slider, the M520 became available on February 18, 2008.

Critical reception to the phone was mostly positive.

References

Mobile phones introduced in 2008
M520